Emil Pakebba Joof Roback (born 3 May 2003) is a Swedish professional footballer who plays as a striker for Serie A club AC Milan. Born in Sweden to Gambian parents, Roback represents the Sweden U19 national team.

Club career

Early career 
Roback started playing football as a youngster with IFK Norrköping, before representing IK Sleipner and Västerhaninge IF in two brief spells.

Hammarby IF 
In 2015, he joined the academy of Allsvenskan side Hammarby IF from Stockholm. On 3 January 2020, Roback signed his first professional contract with Hammarby. On 24 April 2020, Roback played striker alongside Hammarby IF shareholder Zlatan Ibrahimović in an internal friendly game with Hammarby during the COVID-19 pandemic that was televised by Dplay.

Loan to Frej 
He was loaned out to affiliated club IK Frej in Ettan, Sweden's third tier, for the remainder of the 2020 season. He ended up playing 8 games for Frej in 2020.

Return to Hammarby and debut 
On 25 June 2020, Roback returned to Hammarby for their Svenska Cupen match against IFK Göteborg. He made his professional debut after coming on as a 74th minute substitute for Imad Khalili as Hammarby would succumb to a 1–3 defeat.

AC Milan
On 14 August 2020, Roback completed a transfer to Italian Serie A club AC Milan. The transfer fee was reportedly set at around 15-20 million Swedish kronor (approximately £1.3-1.8 million). On January 13, 2022 he made his first team debut, as a substitute, playing the final minutes of a 3–1 victory against Genoa in the Coppa Italia.

On 31 August 2022 it was confirmed, that Roback had joined Danish Superliga club Nordsjælland on a season-long loan deal, with a reported purchase option of €2 million.

International career
Roback has represented his nation Sweden at the under-17 level.

Career statistics

Club

References

2003 births
Living people
Swedish footballers
Swedish expatriate footballers
Sportspeople from Norrköping
Footballers from Östergötland County
Swedish people of Ethiopian descent
Sweden youth international footballers
Association football forwards
IK Sleipner players
IFK Norrköping players
Hammarby Fotboll players
IK Frej players
A.C. Milan players
FC Nordsjælland players
Ettan Fotboll players
Swedish expatriate sportspeople in Italy
Swedish expatriate sportspeople in Denmark
Expatriate footballers in Italy
Expatriate men's footballers in Denmark